Hypoborus ficus, the fig bark beetle, is a species of weevil found in many European, Mediterranean and Asian countries.

Description
This very small beetle has an average length of about 1 to 1.4 mm in female. Male is smaller than female. Body stout and brown in color. Vestiture of plumose and scale like whitish setae or scales, with roughened elevated striae. Head rounded, with visible epicranial suture. In female, head front is shallowly convex, whereas it is impressed in male. Eyes are elongate, entire, and finely faceted. Antenna arise in front of eyes, and with an elongate scape. Antennal funical consists with five segments, where the first segment is elongate and fifth one is transverse. Antennal club is oval. Pronotum armed by 8 to 12 median tubercles, and punctate. Scutellum is absent. Elytral declivity rounded, and the base is armed between suture and steriae. Elytral asteriae is weakly impressed, with small punctures. Punctures are less conspicuous on disc of elytra. Elytra covered with plumose and squamiform setae. First and second leg coxae pair are globose, and contiguous, but the third coxa is transverse. Tibiae generally flattened, and fore tibia consists with three short, stout spicules. Abdomen consists with five visible sternite. 

A polyphagous species with many host plants such as Ficus carica, Ailanthus altissima, Styarax officinalis and Vitis vinifera.

References 

Curculionidae
Insects of Sri Lanka
Beetles described in 1836